

419001–419100 

|-bgcolor=#f2f2f2
| colspan=4 align=center | 
|}

419101–419200 

|-bgcolor=#f2f2f2
| colspan=4 align=center | 
|}

419201–419300 

|-bgcolor=#f2f2f2
| colspan=4 align=center | 
|}

419301–419400 

|-bgcolor=#f2f2f2
| colspan=4 align=center | 
|}

419401–419500 

|-id=435
| 419435 Tiramisu ||  || Tiramisu, a coffee-flavored Italian dessert. The name was suggested by Annick Merlin, wife of French astronomer Jean-Claude Merlin, who discovered this minor planet. || 
|}

419501–419600 

|-id=521
| 419521 Meursault ||  || Meursault, is a French village situated south of Beaune, in the famous Burgundy vineyard region. The Meursault white wine is well-known around the world. || 
|}

419601–419700 

|-bgcolor=#f2f2f2
| colspan=4 align=center | 
|}

419701–419800 

|-bgcolor=#f2f2f2
| colspan=4 align=center | 
|}

419801–419900 

|-id=858
| 419858 Abecheng ||  || Abe Cheng (1953–2021) was a space physicist. He served on NASA's Stratospheric Observatory for Infrared Astronomy (SOFIA) as a senior engineer, preparing the observatory's computer systems for flight and transferring its astronomical data to its scientific teams. || 
|}

419901–420000 

|-bgcolor=#f2f2f2
| colspan=4 align=center | 
|}

References 

419001-420000